Anthony Quinn (1915–2001) was a Mexican/American actor

Anthony Quinn may also refer to:
 Anthony Quinn (boxer) (born 1949), Irish boxer
 Anthony Quinn (judge) (died 2013), American judge
 Anthony Quinn (rugby league) (born 1983), Australian rugby league player
 Anthony Tyler Quinn (born 1962), American actor
 Anthony Quinn Warner (died 2020), American domestic terrorist
 Tony Quinn (businessman) (born 1944), Irish entrepreneur
 Tony Quinn (footballer) (born 1959), retired English footballer